Duda class large harbor tug (YTB) is a class of little known naval auxiliary ship currently in service with the People's Liberation Army Navy (PLAN), and has received NATO reporting name Duda class, with exact type still remains unknown.
A total of eleven of this class have been confirmed in active service as of 2022 Unlike other tugs in Chinese service, This class is the only tug having a chimney with rectangular/square cross section, and thus easily distinguishable by the sharp edges of the chimney.

Ships of this class in PLAN service are designated by a combination of two Chinese characters followed by a three-digit number. The second Chinese character is Tuo (拖), meaning tug in Chinese, because these ships are classified as tugboats. The first Chinese character denotes which fleet the ship is service with, with East (Dong, 东) for East Sea Fleet, North (Bei, 北) for North Sea Fleet, and South (Nan, 南) for South Sea Fleet. However, the pennant numbers are subject to change due to changes of Chinese naval ships naming convention, or when units are transferred to different fleets. Specification:
Length: 31 meter

References

Auxiliary tugboat classes
Auxiliary ships of the People's Liberation Army Navy